The FIH Hockey5s World Cup is an international field hockey competition organised by the International Hockey Federation (FIH). The tournament will start in 2024.

Results

Men

Summaries

Women

Summaries

References

 

field
World Cup